The Gaston County Police Department is a law enforcement agency of Gaston County, North Carolina, United States. It is the only county police department within the State of North Carolina.

The Gaston County Police Department has the primary responsibility for the enforcement of North Carolina state laws and Gaston County ordinances in unincorporated areas of the county. Law enforcement within the incorporated municipalities of Gaston County is generally the primary responsibility of the police departments of the particular municipalities. However, the Gaston County Police Department is also the primary law enforcement agency for the incorporated cities of High Shoals and Spencer Mountain. They are also authorized to respond to calls in all areas of the county.

The Gaston County Police Department is a separate agency from the Gaston County Sheriff's Office, which has the responsibilities of managing the county jail, protecting the county courthouse, serving civil and criminal documents, and pursuing and arresting fugitives from legal actions taken through the courts.

In addition, the department employs 90 civilians. It has an operating budget of 11.9 million dollars.

Organization
The Gaston County Police Department is organized into four divisions, each of which is headed by an assistant chief or director, who is responsible to the chief of police.

Community Policing Division

The Community Policing Division is composed primarily of uniformed officers and is responsible for controlling and preventing crime through regular patrols, answering calls for service, apprehending suspected offenders, enforcing criminal and traffic laws, conducting preliminary investigations, and working with the community to solve neighborhood crime problems. The division is overseen by an assistant chief.  The officers are assigned to one of four geographical areas (known as zones), each of which is commanded by a captain. The officers assigned to each zone are further divided into squads (supervised by a sergeant) that cover rotating 12-hour shifts. The four patrol zones are:
 Zone 2 - the northeastern part of the County, covering  with more than 30,000 residents.

The Community Policing Division also has two specialized patrol units: the K-9 Unit and the Marine Enforcement Unit. The K-9 Unit consists of six handler and dog teams responsible for responding to crimes in progress, performing street-level drug interdiction, and assisting all divisions of the Department (as well as other agencies in the county and surrounding counties) by conducting specialized searches with trained law enforcement dogs. The searches include searches of houses and vehicles for illegal drugs, searches of buildings for suspects, and area searches for evidence and tracks of subjects that have run in an attempt to elude arrest.

The Marine Enforcement Unit operates on a seasonal basis from June until October at Lake Wylie and Mountain Island Lake. It is responsible of enforcing boating laws, conducting boating safety inspections, removing navigational hazards, answering calls for service, enforcing shoreline laws, and providing assistance to boaters and other governmental agencies. The unit consists of four full-time and three part-time officers, and uses a 22-foot boat and two jet-skis for patrol.

Investigative and Support Services Division

The Investigative and Support Services Division, overseen by an assistant chief, is composed of several specialized units:
 The Criminal Investigations Unit is responsible for the investigation of homicides and other major felony offenses, select misdemeanors, missing persons, unattended deaths, offenses involving juveniles, and the processing of evidence. It also includes the Crime Scene Search Unit and the Property and Evidence Unit, which is responsible for the storage and maintenance of all items collected by the Department during criminal investigations.
 The Special Investigations Unit is primarily responsible for narcotics investigations, but is also charged with investigating gambling, illegal alcohol, and prostitution offenses.
 The Support Services Unit includes educational services (which provides student resource officers to Gaston County schools), employee development (responsible for employee training), recruitment and selection (which handles all aspects of the hiring process), accreditation (which is responsible for maintaining all necessary information to maintain compliance with accreditation standards), police information processing (primarily responsible for maintaining the department's records), and the victim and witness coordinator (who provides assistance to victims and witnesses of crimes and traumatic incidents).
 The Emergency Response Team is a group of highly trained officers available 24 hours a day to respond to critical and high risk incidents. They also support other wlaw enforcement agencies in Gaston and neighboring counties when requested. The team is divided into three subteams: negotiators, marksman–observers, and tactical entry.
 The Hazardous Devices Team is a four-member team recognized by the FBI and National Bomb Squad Advisory Board as an accredited bomb squad.

Communications Division

The Communications Division is a multi-agency, multi-jurisdictional dispatch center providing 24-hour coverage of emergency 911 calls and radio transmissions for Gaston County.  It is composed of 53 employees led by a director. The unit is charged with maintaining and operating the computer-aided dispatch system for police, fire, and medical calls, as well as receiving both emergency and non-emergency calls for service.

Animal Care and Enforcement

The Animal Care and Enforcement Division is responsible for enforcing animal-related North Carolina laws and Gaston County ordinances. It is meant to protect county citizens from dangerous animals and to ensure the proper care and treatment of animals. The animal shelter is led by an administrator and the enforcement side is led by a police captain.  The Unit is composed of 22 employees including both sworn and non-sworn personnel.

Citizens' Police Academy

The Citizens' Police Academy is an eleven-week educational program for Gaston County residents in an academy setting. It is intended to acquaint them with law enforcement's role in the criminal justice system and to provide an understanding of the tasks police officers face in their daily work. The instructors are officers and personnel from the department who teach in their own areas of expertise.

The sessions begin with the presentation of the department's philosophy toward community oriented policing, which encourages citizens to develop a sense of cooperation with police in the common goal of providing a safe and secure community for all citizens. Following sessions include classes on communications, community policing, property and evidence, patrol procedures, juvenile unit, repeat offenders, criminal investigations, school resource officers, drug abuse resistance education, records, criminal law, accreditation, training and employee development, crime analysis, special investigations, crime scenes, hazardous devices, victim assistance, emergency response teams, K-9, animal control, and environmental crimes.  Members may, if they choose to do so, ride in a patrol car for one shift to see first-hand what officers see and hear, and what they are trained to do under a variety of circumstances.

Line of duty deaths 

Officer Randy Michael "Moose" Pendleton ended his watch on Monday, 5 February 1979, when his cruiser was broadsided at a high speed by a felon who was fleeing other officers. The felon was later apprehended after Officer Pendleton had succumbed to his injuries. A plaque stands in the main station of the Gaston County Police Department. He is also remembered at the North Carolina Law Enforcement Officers Memorial.

See also

 List of law enforcement agencies in North Carolina

References

External links
 
 
 Gaston County Law Enforcement Association

Gaston County, North Carolina
County police departments of North Carolina
1957 establishments in North Carolina